José Luis Rodriguez Inguanzo (20 April 1957 – 18 December 1982) was a Spanish professional racing cyclist. He rode in the 1982 Tour de France.

References

External links
 

1957 births
1982 deaths
Spanish male cyclists
People from the Western Coast of Cantabria
Cyclists from Cantabria